Ulrichsen is a Norwegian surname. Notable people with the surname include:

 Jarl Henning Ulrichsen (born 1947), Norwegian chess master
 Kjell Christian Ulrichsen (born 1944), Norwegian businessperson
 Kjell Ulrichsen (born 1944), Norwegian curler

Norwegian-language surnames